Pipariya Diyara is a village in lakhisarai district, State :- Bihar .

district]]

[[Category:Villages in Lakhisarai
Villages in Lakhisarai district